Qullqa Sirka (Aymara qullqa granary, sirka vein of the body or a mine, "granary vein", also spelled Colcasirca) is a mountain in the Andes of Peru, about  high. It is located in the Puno Region, Lampa Province, Ocuviri District. Qullqa Sirka lies north of Machu Kunturi and northeast of T'akra.

References

Mountains of Peru
Mountains of Puno Region